Hiouchi (Tolowa: Xaa-yuu-chit) is a census-designated place in Del Norte County, California. Its population is 314 as of the 2020 census, up from 301 from the 2010 census.

Climate
Hiouchi has a hot-summer mediterranean climate (Csb) typical of coastal California with moderate temperatures year-round consisting of warm summers and cool, rainy winters.

Demographics

The 2010 United States Census reported that Hiouchi had a population of 301. The racial makeup of Hiouchi was 267 (88.7%) White, 0 (0.0%) African American, 11 (3.7%) Native American, 6 (2.0%) Asian, 2 (0.7%) Pacific Islander, 8 (2.7%) from other races, and 7 (2.3%) from two or more races. Hispanic or Latino of any race were 11 persons (3.7%).

The Census reported that 301 people (100% of the population) lived in households, 0 (0%) lived in non-institutionalized group quarters, and 0 (0%) were institutionalized.

There were 143 households, out of which 29 (20.3%) had children under the age of 18 living in them, 73 (51.0%) were opposite-sex married couples living together, 11 (7.7%) had a female householder with no husband present, 5 (3.5%) had a male householder with no wife present.  There were 4 (2.8%) unmarried opposite-sex partnerships, and 1 (0.7%) same-sex married couples or partnerships. 49 households (34.3%) were made up of individuals, and 20 (14.0%) had someone living alone who was 65 years of age or older. The average household size was 2.10.  There were 89 families (62.2% of all households); the average family size was 2.66.

The population was spread out, with 52 people (17.3%) under the age of 18, 9 people (3.0%) aged 18 to 24, 55 people (18.3%) aged 25 to 44, 116 people (38.5%) aged 45 to 64, and 69 people (22.9%) who were 65 years of age or older.  The median age was 54.2 years. For every 100 females, there were 104.8 males.  For every 100 females age 18 and over, there were 93.0 males.

The homeowner vacancy rate was 1.0%; the rental vacancy rate was 4.3%.  214 people (71.1% of the population) lived in owner-occupied housing units and 87 people (28.9%) lived in rental housing units.

Politics 

Notable residents
Greg Noll, surfer

See also

References

Census-designated places in Del Norte County, California
Census-designated places in California